Andrew Pera Wozniewski (born May 25, 1980) is an American former professional ice hockey defenseman who played in the National Hockey League (NHL) with the Toronto Maple Leafs, St. Louis Blues and the Boston Bruins.

Playing career
Undrafted, Wozniewski played collegiate hockey for the University of Wisconsin–Madison. He signed his first pro contract with the Toronto Maple Leafs on May 27, 2004. He scored his first NHL goal October 11, 2007 for the Toronto Maple Leafs against the New York Islanders.

Andy was signed as a free agent by the St. Louis Blues on July 17, 2008, and later assigned to the Blues affiliate, the Peoria Rivermen. Wozniewski was recalled to the Blues on February 1, 2009. He played in one game with the Blues before he was reassigned to the Rivermen.

Wozniewski was traded from the Blues to the Pittsburgh Penguins in exchange for Danny Richmond on March 4, 2009.

After the Penguins, Wozniewski signed with the Boston Bruins, on May 5, 2010, Wozniewski left the Bruins and signed a one-year contract in the Swiss NLA with EV Zug.

After three seasons with Zug, Wozniewski left Switzerland out of contract and signed a one-year deal as a free agent in the German DEL, with EHC München on June 4, 2013.  During his time in Europe, Wozniewski was selected to play for Team USA in the Deutschland Cup in 2011 and 2013, leading Team USA to a championship as the Captain in 2013.

Career statistics

References

External links

1980 births
Living people
American men's ice hockey defensemen
American people of Polish descent
Boston Bruins players
Dubuque Fighting Saints players
EHC München players
EV Zug players
People from Buffalo Grove, Illinois
Peoria Rivermen (AHL) players
Providence Bruins players
St. John's Maple Leafs players
St. Louis Blues players
Toronto Maple Leafs players
Toronto Marlies players
Undrafted National Hockey League players
Wilkes-Barre/Scranton Penguins players
Wisconsin Badgers men's ice hockey players
University of Massachusetts Lowell alumni
Ice hockey players from Illinois
UMass Lowell River Hawks men's ice hockey players